The California Milk Processor Board is a nonprofit marketing board funded by California dairy processors and administered by the California Department of Food and Agriculture. It is most well known for its Got Milk? advertising campaign. 

The organization was created in 1993 to counter falling sales of milk as Americans switched to soft drinks, health drinks, and other beverages.

The board is separate from the California Milk Advisory Board, which created the Happy Cows campaign and supports the Californian dairy industry.

Promotions
In 1993, the Board launched its most successful and longest-lasting campaign, "Got Milk?".  Designed initially by Goodby, Silverstein & Partners, the campaign is intended to convince current milk-drinkers to consume more milk.

In 2008, the Board launched the "White Gold" marketing campaign to appeal to teenagers, featuring a self-consciously fake rock band style commercial, with lead singer "White Gold" performing with the "Calcium Twins".

In 2009, the Board launched a sequel to the "White Gold" campaign by releasing "The Battle for Milkquarious", a 22-minute-long rock opera featuring an array of old and new characters, including "White Gold", Strawberry Summers, Jug Life, Bovina the Uni-Pega-Cow, and the evil Nasterious.  It was marketed as "The most amazing rock opera ever made about milk."

In 2011, the Board was criticized for its "Everything I do is wrong" campaign which critics claimed was bigoted.  The board halted the campaign early, but enjoyed the negative publicity generated by launching a new site - www.gotdiscussion.org.

See also
 Dairy Promotion Program
 Dairy Management Inc.

References

External links
gotmilk.com - official Got Milk? site

Agricultural marketing organizations
American dairy organizations
Organizations based in California
Dairy marketing
Agricultural marketing in the United States
Dairy products companies in California